Prince Alexander von Fürstenberg (born Alexandre Egon Prinz von Fürstenberg; January 25, 1970) is an American businessman and socialite and the son of fashion designer Diane von Fürstenberg (née Halfin) and Prince Egon von Fürstenberg.

Early life and education
He is the son of fashion designers Diane von Fürstenberg (née Halfin) and Prince Egon von Fürstenberg. His mother is from a Belgian Jewish family, from present-day Moldova and Greece; and his father was half German and half Italian, the son of the German Prince Tassilo zu Fürstenberg of the House of Fürstenberg and his Italian first wife, Clara Agnelli, the elder sister of the chairman of FIAT, Gianni Agnelli. His parents separated in 1972, and were divorced in 1983.

Prince Alexander and his sister Princess Tatiana von Fürstenberg were raised in New York City. Alex attended Brown University, where he earned a Bachelor of Arts degree in 1993.

Work

Alexander von Fürstenberg began his career in 1993 as a trader on the Risk Arbitrage Desk of Allen and Company. He is now the Chief Investment Officer of Ranger Global Advisors, LLC, a family company he founded which focuses on opportunistic value-based investing. Previously, he was the Co-Managing Member and Chief Investment Officer of Arrow Capital Management, LLC, a private investment firm focused on global public equities. Since 2001, he has acted as Chief Investment Officer of Arrow Investments, Inc., a private investment office that serves the Diller-von Furstenberg family.

Fürstenberg led the restructuring of Diane von Fürstenberg Studio, LP, a global luxury lifestyle brand, taking it from $100 million in annual revenue to more than $200 million. He remains a partner and director in the company and also serves on the Board of Directors of IAC, a U.S.-based internet conglomerate.

Philanthropy

Fürstenberg is Director and Secretary of the Diller-von Furstenberg Family Foundation, which is managed by him, his mother, Diane von Fürstenberg, his stepfather, Barry Diller, the former Chief Executive of IAC/InterActiveCorp, and his sister, Princess Tatiana von Fürstenberg.

The Diller–von Furstenberg Family Foundation is involved in a number of charitable pursuits in education, community reform, environmental advocacy, disease research, childcare, arts and humanities and human rights. The foundation is also responsible for two significant endowments to the High Line, a New York City park built on the foundations of a decommissioned high line railway. Fürstenberg serves on the Board of Directors of Our Time, Board of Friends of the High Line, and the National Advisory Council of ACRIA.

Personal life
As a teen he lived in the Carlyle Hotel, two floors below duty-free shops owner Robert Warren Miller and his family; that is where he met Miller's youngest daughter Alexandra, who was three years his junior. They married on October 28, 1995, in a Catholic ceremony at the Church of St. Ignatius Loyola in New York City. They had two children, Talita Natasha (b. May 7, 1999) and Tassilo Egon Maximilian (b. August 26, 2001), who is named for his paternal great-grandfather. In 2002, they separated and were later divorced. He later announced his engagement to designer Alison "Ali" Kay, who gave birth to their son Leon in July 2012. Ali Kay gave birth to a second son Vito in June 2020 and on September 19, 2020, Kay's 36th birthday, the couple civilly married.

See also
List of Greek Americans

References

1970 births
Living people
Agnelli family
American chief executives
American corporate directors
American people of Belgian-Jewish descent
American people of German descent
American people of Greek-Jewish descent
American people of Italian descent
American people of Moldovan-Jewish descent
Philanthropists from New York (state)
American socialites
Brown University alumni
Businesspeople from New York City
Catholics from California
Alexander
German princes
People from Malibu, California
Chief investment officers